Dame Alexandra Margaret Martin Hasluck, Lady Hasluck,  (née Darker; 26 August 1908 – 18 June 1993), also known as Alix Hasluck, was an author and social historian from Western Australia. She was the wife of Sir Paul Hasluck, Governor-General of Australia.

Biography
Born in Perth, Western Australia, the only child of John William Darker and Evelyn Margaret ( Hill) Darker, she attended Presbyterian Ladies' College from 1916 to 1918, followed by Perth College, and was a graduate of the University of Western Australia.

In 1932, she married Paul Hasluck, who (as Sir Paul) was Governor-General of Australia 1969–1974. In 1974 he was offered an extension of his term by the Prime Minister, Gough Whitlam, and he was willing to serve an extra two years, but Lady Hasluck (as she then was) refused to remain at Yarralumla longer than the originally agreed five years. Whitlam then appointed Sir John Kerr. Historians of the period are certain that if Hasluck had still been Governor-General in 1975, as he would have been had his wife not intervened, the constitutional crisis of that year would have ended differently. Hasluck himself implied this in his book, The Office of Governor-General and also in the Queale Lecture.

In the 1978 Queen's Birthday Honours, Lady Hasluck was appointed the first Dame of the Order of Australia for "pre-eminent achievement in the fields of literature and history and for extraordinary and meritorious public service to Australia".

Dame Alexandra Hasluck's published works included talks to the Royal West Australian Historical Society as well as 11 books and numerous articles. Another achievement was the editing of Audrey Tennyson's Vice-Regal Days, written by Lady Audrey Tennyson, wife of Hallam Tennyson, 2nd Baron Tennyson, who was Governor-General from 1903 to 1904.

Death
She died in 1993.  Dame Alexandra and Sir Paul Hasluck are joint eponyms of the Western Australian Federal House of Representatives Division of Hasluck.

Publications
 Georgiana Molloy: Portrait with Background (1955)
 Unwilling Emigrants (1959)
 Thomas Peel of Swan River (1965)
 Audrey Tennyson's Vice-Regal Days (1978)
 Portrait in a Mirror (1981).

See also
 Spouse of the Governor-General of Australia

References

Further reading

External links 

 Alexandra Hasluck interviewed by Hazel de Berg – audio recording

1908 births
1993 deaths
Historians from Western Australia
Dames of the Order of Australia
Writers from Perth, Western Australia
Spouses of Australian Governors-General
Australian people of English descent
University of Western Australia alumni
Australian women historians
20th-century Australian historians
20th-century Australian women writers
Australian monarchists
Wives of knights